The MIL, Inc. Thunder 5 is a double-action revolver chambered to fire both the .410-bore shotshell cartridge and the .45 Colt revolver cartridge.

Description
The Thunder 5 is a large revolver, nine inches in overall length weighing 48 ounces, despite having only a two inch snubnose barrel. The Thunder 5 is chambered for 3-inch-long (76 mm) .410 shotgun shells and .45 Colt cartridges. As the barrel is rifled, the Thunder 5 is not considered a short-barrelled shotgun under United States federal law, but is restricted under California statutes.  In 1994 a variant was produced in .45/70 Government that is legal in California.

It was fitted with Pachmayr decelerator grips and was available in either matte or bright stainless steel finish with fixed sights. Unusual for a double-action revolver, the Thunder 5 features a manual safety lever. Sub-caliber sleeve inserts in 9mm Parabellum, .38 Special/.357 Magnum and .38 Super were produced and available until 1998.

It did appear in a few contemporary movies such as RoboCop 3 (1993), Black Dog (1998), and Three Kings (1999); but otherwise generated little interest and was discontinued in 1999. After it was discontinued, the Thunder 5 became a collector's item. In recent years the concept of the .410/.45 hybrid revolver has been revived by Taurus and Smith & Wesson.

See also
Similar weapons
 Taurus Judge
 Smith & Wesson Governor
 Bond Arms Derringer
 .410 bore
 MAG-7

References

External links
 Thunder 5 Manual

Revolvers of the United States
.45 Colt firearms